George Nathan Benson (May 7, 1919 – August 24, 2001) was a professional American football halfback. He was a member of the Brooklyn Dodgers team of the All-America Football Conference.

References

1919 births
2001 deaths
American football halfbacks
LSU Tigers football players
Northwestern Wildcats football players
Brooklyn Dodgers (AAFC) players
Players of American football from Indiana
People from Madison, Indiana